Pudupattinam is a village in the Thanjavur taluk of Thanjavur district, Tamil Nadu, India.

Demographics 

As per the 2001 census, Pudupattinam had a total population of 7261 with 3577 males and 3684 females. The sex ratio was 1030. The literacy rate was 85.02.

References 

 

Villages in Thanjavur district